Gypsy Sisters was an American reality television series on TLC. The series debuted on February 10, 2013. It follows the daily life of Romanichal women located in Martinsburg, West Virginia. The series serves as a spin-off to its sister show My Big Fat American Gypsy Wedding. The second season premiered on December 5, 2013. The third season premiered August 21, 2014. The fourth season premiered on May 31, 2015. TLC officially cancelled the series on July 30, 2015 due to low ratings.

Cast

 Nettie Stanley (Season 1 - Season 4), Nettie is The “[matriarch]” of the family. The self-proclaimed mother hen of her gypsy girls. Nettie is the daughter of Lottie Mae Stanley, a Gypsy who was regular on America’s Most Wanted through the last three decades. Sisters to Joann Wells, Mellie Stanley, Dovie Carter, Tanya and Brandi and cousins to Shiela “Kayla” Williams”, Annie Williams, and Laura Johnston. Nettie is married to third husband, paver Huey Stanley and has nine children; Albert “Whitey”, Heath, Destiny (deceased), Dallas, Nettie “Nukkie”, Chasitie, Huey, Shiela and Katherine “Kat”. Along with being a mother of nine, Nettie cares for her husband, younger sister Mellie, nieces, nephews and grandchildren through the series. Her and her family have appeared on many episodes of My Big Fat American Gypsy Wedding prior to filming Gypsy Sisters. After some issues in her personal life, and losing her step son in a violent event, she left TV behind to raise her family out of the spotlight. In January of 2022, Nettie and Huey Stanley were arrested for conspiracy and fraudulent scheming.   
 Mellie Stanley  (Season 1 - Season 4), Mellie is Nettie, Dovie and Joann's younger sister. Known as the black sheep of the family, Mellie wants to break away from the gypsy lifestyle. She is now a single mother of four children; son Richard Joe Whetzel Stanley (born 2013, with ex-husband Robbie York), daughter Brandy'Wyne Leveniya Picolo (born January 2015 with Nik Picolo), daughter Divinity Rose Lee (born November 2016, with ex-husband George Lee Jr.), and daughter Serenity Faye West (born March 2020, with partner MJ West). In 2017, Mellie along with then husband George Lee, was arrested for an $18,000 Toys R' Us and Babies R' Us coupon fraud scam. She was sentenced to five years probation in 2019, with the requirement she would have to obtain her G.E.D in that time.
 JoAnn Wells (Season 2 - Season 4), Mellie, Dovie and Nettie's sister. She has two kids and has recently separated from her husband of thirteen years. She's the good-natured one of the bunch. In season 3, she announced she plans to divorce her husband. In 2016, JoAnn reconciled with her husband, Belcher however the two later split and she remarried. JoAnn was arrested in 2014 for a $14,000 Target coupon fraud scam. She later pleaded guilty and was sentenced to 24 months supervised probation in lieu of 6 to 17 months in prison, and ordered to pay Target back $14,786 in restitution. 
 Sheila "Kayla" Williams (Season 1 - Season 4) Annie's sister. She has five children: Danielle, Kayla (Sissy), Richard, Lexi, and George. Kayla and her husband of seventeen years, Richard, are now divorced. Kayla was briefly married to Adam Prather before they divorced and she is now married to Benny Small. She is now a grandmother as her daughter, Danielle, has two daughters with her husband George and her daughter Sissy, has two sons and a daughter with her husband Bruce. Her ex-husband Richard has two sons with Danielle Malone (sister to James Malone, the father of Dallas’ daughters, and Annie's ex husband).  
 Angela "Annie" Malone (Season 2 - Season 4), Kayla's sister. Annie has five kids but still has plenty of growing up to do. Annie is playful and fun and always makes the other girls laugh with her silly antics. After her Big Fat Gypsy wedding to her cousin Josh failed,  Annie married James Malone, the father of her cousin Dallas' children. Jay and Annie divorced and she has since remarried. 
 Dovie Carter (Season 4) Nettie, Mellie, and JoAnn's sister. Dovie is the family peacemaker and is like JoAnn.
 Laura Johnston (Season 1), Kayla's and Annie's sister-in-law. Laura married into the gypsy clan when she married Kayla and Annie's brother Gus. Together they have three daughters Savannah, Hailey and Bella.
 Sheena Small (Season 2), First cousin to Mellie, Nettie, JoAnn, Dovie, Kayla and Annie.  She was formerly married to Mellie and Nettie's brother Henry. Together they had four girls; Shakira, Shania, Shirley, and Frankie.
Dallas Nichole Williams  (Multiple seasons) Nettie's oldest daughter, and mother of Demi, Richard, London, Aaron, Archie, and Huey. As of Christmas time 2016, she was once again reconciled with James Malone, much to his wife's - (Dallas' cousin) chagrin. The reconciliation between Dallas and Jay was short lived, he has since left her. 
Nettie "Nuckie" Williams (Multiple seasons) After a marriage that produced one child, Prince Henry, Nuckie left Pookie and her son to travel the roads and see the world with her heroin addict boyfriend. As of December 2016, she had been found by Pookie and Samantha and returned to her mother at long last. Samantha later left Pookie in February and filed divorce and in March Pookie went on to pursue a relationship with Nuckie again, they welcomed their second child together, a daughter named Ivory born November 2017, and another daughter Delilah Dee, born in 2019.

Episodes

Series overview

Season 1 (2013)

Season 2 (2013–14)

Season 3 (2014)

Season 4 (2015)

Christmas Special

References

2010s American reality television series
2013 American television series debuts
2015 American television series endings
English-language television shows
Television shows set in West Virginia
Romani in the United States
TLC (TV network) original programming
Romani mass media
Reality television spin-offs
Martinsburg, West Virginia
American television spin-offs
History of women in West Virginia
Television series about sisters